The Whipple Cast and Wrought Iron Bowstring Truss Bridge (locally known as the Normanskill Farm Bridge), is located near the entrance to Stevens Farm in southwestern Albany, New York, United States. It was built in 1867, but not moved to its present location until 1899. It is one of the oldest surviving iron bridges in the county, one of the few that use both cast and wrought iron and one of only two surviving examples of the Whipple bowstring truss type. In 1971 it was listed on the National Register of Historic Places, the only bridge in the city of Albany so far to be listed individually.

A Syracuse-based builder copied Squire Whipple's original bowstring truss design, the patent for which had expired by the time of its construction. Where it was originally located is not known; it is believed to have been somewhere west of the city, possibly in Schoharie County.

When the old Albany and Delaware Turnpike, today Delaware Avenue, was rerouted in 1899 to what is now Normanskill Drive, it was moved to its present location to make the farm more accessible from the main road. When Delaware was straightened out into what is today New York State Route 443 (NY 443), traffic on the bridge went down, allowing the bridge to remain in use, although only for cars. Today it is limited only to pedestrian use, and is closed in winter. The City of Albany approved a small-scale restoration project in 2012.

Site and structure

The bridge carries Mill Road across a deep ravine about 100 feet (30 m) west of Normanskill Drive. The surrounding area is wooded; to the west of the ravine the woods give way almost immediately to the Stevens Farm complex. The ravine is dry most of the time, but after heavy rains it carries water from a small basin extending northeast a quarter-mile (400 m) as far as the New York State Thruway (Interstate 87) to the Normans Kill  to the south, which at this point is the boundary between the city of Albany and the town of Bethlehem to the south. To the east the land rises steeply. The wooded, park-like area gives way to a more developed residential neighborhood along the north side of today's Delaware Avenue (NY 443), opposite a large cemetery.

The approach road is a narrow gravel strip. Its main components are the two top and two bottom chords.

On top, the chords form an arch of nine tangential castings of an inverted-U cast-iron bars which compress in response to a load. They are matched by bottom chords of two lines of nine wrought-iron open links, made from one-and-a-half-inch square bars, which restrain the compression. They are connected by eight vertical rods on each side, with tie rods additionally bracing the two in the middle that rise the highest.

The four central vertical members on each side are inverted V's of two -inch bars welded together at the top and inserted into the floor beams via threaded bottom ends. At the ends the verticals are four  rods. Rods  of an inch wide form the diagonals, double in each panel, bracing the bridge against wind.

Latitudinal and longitudinal I-beams supported by the bottom chords provide a deck frame. They are trussed with two -inch wrought iron rods and braced by tie rods. Wooden planks laid horizontally across the frame serve as the deck. Modern box girder guardrails run along both sides.

History

Albany resident Squire Whipple is considered the first bridge builder to apply scientific principles to the field, moving it from what had that point been primarily a tradesman's domain toward that of the civil engineer. His self-published 1847 book A Work on Bridge Building is considered the first to have properly analyzed the stresses on bridge trusses, and developed mathematical procedures to account for them that are still useful. It was not fully appreciated until the last years of his life, in the 1880s.

Seven years before writing his book, he had realized that the Erie Canal, slowly nearing completion across the state, would require hundreds of bridges. His iron bowstring truss was a solution to how that could be accomplished quickly and cheaply. With a thousand dollars he had saved, he built the first one across the canal at Utica in 1841.

It was successful, and proved highly popular. So popular, that despite Whipple's patent on the design, it was widely imitated, keeping Whipple in court in a vain effort to secure royalties from several alleged infringers. He sometimes prevailed, but more often slight refinements or variations on the design were enough for a ruling in their favor. Other builders may simply not have been aware the bowstring truss was protected intellectual property. The state of New York chose the design as its standard for the canal—then avoided royalties, under the law of that time, by declaring the bridges were being built "for the public good." Within years Whipple's design was widely used all over the Northeast. Despite that popularity, only one other one remains in use in New York, over Cayadutta Creek near Fonda, in the Mohawk Valley.

Whipple had renewed the patent on its original expiration in 1855, but by the time of its 1869 expiration had given up trying to enforce it. It was two years before the end of that period that the bridge currently in Albany was built by Simon De Graff of Syracuse. Where, exactly, it was built is not known. When bought for the current location it was described as having been in "Schoharie". De Graff's location, and the bridge's popularity along the canal, could also argue for a location even further west.

One of the advantages of Whipple's bowstring truss that builders like De Graff were quick to see, and improve, was their ease of assembly and portability. They could shipped to their desired location in small pieces and put together quickly, without too many specialized tools. If they needed to be moved, they could be disassembled with relative ease and similarly reassembled at the new location.

It was this feature that made the bridge an attractive purchase to the owners of the Normanskill Farm 32 years later. The Albany and Delaware Turnpike, main road from the city to its southwest, was being rerouted north from Normansville in 1899 to the alignment that Normanskill Drive presently follows around the hillside, becoming Old Delaware Avenue once it crosses the Normans Kill into Bethlehem. The new routing made it a natural choice to build an access road from the farm to the turnpike, to replace the steep climb the original access road (Mill Road's continuation) had had. The bridge was purchased to cross the ravine for that purpose, and installed on newly constructed stone and mortar abutments in 1900.

By the middle of the 20th century the turnpike had been rerouted again. Newer technology had made it possible for the road, now part of New York State Route 443, to follow the current straight route across the ravine, on a viaduct over the bridge built a half-century earlier, which remained in place. What had been the main road to the farm was now just another quiet detour.

At the time the bridge was surveyed by the Historic American Engineering Record (HAER), around 1969, only cars were allowed over it due to its age. Eventually the city of Albany bought the farm, using it as a park, a training facility and stables for police horses and an environmental education center. Early in the 21st century it had to close the bridge to vehicles and to all traffic during the winter months when some small cracks were detected during an inspection. In 2012 the city council authorized $150,000 to repair them.

See also

List of bridges and tunnels on the National Register of Historic Places in New York
List of bridges documented by the Historic American Engineering Record in New York (state)
National Register of Historic Places listings in Albany, New York

References

External links

Historic American Engineering Record in New York (state)
Road bridges on the National Register of Historic Places in New York (state)
Bridges completed in 1867
Buildings and structures in Albany, New York
Truss bridges in the United States
Relocated buildings and structures in New York (state)
1867 establishments in New York (state)
National Register of Historic Places in Albany, New York
Wrought iron bridges in the United States
Iron bridges in the United States
Whipple truss bridges in the United States